McKinley Washington Jr. (August 8, 1936 – July 24, 2022) was an American politician in the state of South Carolina. He served in the South Carolina House of Representatives from 1975 to 1990 and the South Carolina Senate from 1990 to 2000. He was the pastor of the Edisto Presbyterian Church in Edisto Beach, South Carolina. Washington received his bachelor's degree from Johnson C. Smith University and his master's degree in divinity from Johnson C. Smith Theological Seminary.

In 1992, the bridge on South Carolina Highway 174 over the Dawhoo River in Charleston County was named the McKinley Washington, Jr. Bridge in honor of the distinguished service that Senator Washington has given to the district in which he has served and to the State.

References

1936 births
2022 deaths
People from Charleston County, South Carolina
People from Mayesville, South Carolina
Johnson C. Smith University alumni
Interdenominational Theological Center alumni
Democratic Party South Carolina state senators
Democratic Party members of the South Carolina House of Representatives
African-American state legislators in South Carolina
American Presbyterian ministers
20th-century American politicians
20th-century African-American politicians